Jiahe County is a county in Hunan Province, China, it is under the administration of Chenzhou prefecture-level City.

Located on the southern part of the province and the west of Chenzhou, the county is bordered to the northwest by Xintian County, to the east and northeast by Guiyang County, to the south by Linwu County, to the west by Lanshan and Ningyuan Counties. The county has nine towns and a township under its jurisdiction, the county seat is Zhuquan.

Administrative divisions
9 towns
 Guangfa
 Jinping
 Longtan
 Shiqiao
 Tangcun
 Tanping
 Xinglang
 Yuanjia
 Zhuquan

1 township
 Puman

Climate

References
www.xzqh.org

External links 

 
County-level divisions of Hunan
Geography of Chenzhou